Acestridium is a genus of freshwater fish in the family Loricariidae of order Siluriformes. The type species is Acestridium discus. The genus name is derived from Latinised Greek 'agkistron' meaning hook.

Acestridium species are native to small streams of the Amazon region of Brazil, Venezuela, and Colombia. Species of this genus are found in litter banks.

Members of this genus typically are long and thin, or 'twiglike' and superficially resemble the genus Farlowella of the same family. Adult length is 5–7 cm and each species shows adaptation for camouflage in the water margins - bright green leaf like in Acestridium dichromum and varigated brown in other species.

Species 
There are currently seven recognized species in this genus:
 Acestridium colombiense Retzer, 2005
 Acestridium dichromum Retzer, Nico & Provenzano, 1999
 Acestridium discus Haseman, 1911
 Acestridium gymnogaster Reis & Lehmann A., 2009
 Acestridium martini Retzer, Nico & Provenzano, 1999
 Acestridium scutatum Reis & Lehmann A., 2009
 Acestridium triplax Rodriguez & Reis, 2007

References

Hypoptopomatini
Fish of South America
Catfish genera
Freshwater fish genera